Háj u Duchcova is a municipality and village in Teplice District in the Ústí nad Labem Region of the Czech Republic. It has about 1,300 inhabitants.

Administrative parts
The village of Domaslavice is an administrative part of Háj u Duchcova.

Gallery

References

Villages in Teplice District